Imelda Therinne (born in Jakarta, Indonesia on May 19, 1982) is an Indonesian actress and model of Minangkabau descent.

Career
She began her career as a model at the age of 17, and first became popular with the public after starring the movie Angker Batu in 2007. That same year, she starred in the comedy film Quickie Express, about three young gigolos. In 2013, she starred the thriller-horror film Belenggu. Her work as the character Jingga won her the "Best Actress" award and a nomination for "Favorite Actress" at the 2013 Indonesian Movie Awards.

Personal life
Imelda Therinne was born on May 19, 1982 in Jakarta. She is the only child of Ridwan D. Tamin and Thelma D. Tamin. On August 7, 2010, she married Aldijan Diah at Le Méridien. Her dowry was 102 kg of gold. They have one child.

Filmography

Film

Television

Awards and nominations

References

External links
 Imelda Therinne: Antara Karier dan Keluarga Femina.co.id.
 Kesibukan Imelda Therinne Jelang Pernikahan tabloidbintang.com, 1 August 2010.

1982 births
Living people
People from Jakarta
Indonesian Muslims
Indonesian actresses
Indonesian female models